Orsa has been borne by at least three ships of the Italian Navy and may refer to:

 , an  launched in 1906 and discarded in 1921.
 , an  launched in 1937 and stricken in 1964.
 , a  launched in 1979 and transferred to Peru as Aguirre in 2004. 

Italian Navy ship names